Carlton B. McKinney (born October 21, 1964), is a retired professional basketball player. McKinney played collegiate ball with the University of Tulsa Golden Hurricane (1983–1985) and Southern Methodist University Mustangs (1986–88). He briefly played in the NBA with the Los Angeles Clippers (1989) and the New York Knicks (1991).   McKinney is currently the athletic director and boys' basketball coach at his high school alma mater, Nixon-Smiley High School, in Nixon, TX.

Professional career

McKinney briefly played in the NBA with the Los Angeles Clippers (1989) and the New York Knicks (1991).  He played the majority of his professional basketball career in the CBA for the Topeka Sizzlers (1988–89), Quad City Thunder (1989–90), Santa Barbara Islanders (1990), Rapid City Thrillers (1990–91), Fargo-Moorhead Fever (1991–1992), Grand Rapids Hoops (1993–94) and Sioux Falls Skyforce (1994–1996), where he helped win a championship before retiring in 1996.  He also played overseas in Europe notably in Italy, Greece and Spain.

References

1964 births
Living people
AEK B.C. players
Alaska Aces (PBA) players
American expatriate basketball people in Greece
American expatriate basketball people in Italy
American expatriate basketball people in the Philippines
American expatriate basketball people in Spain
American men's basketball players
Basketball players from San Diego
CB Zaragoza players
Fargo-Moorhead Fever players
Grand Rapids Hoops players
Liga ACB players
Los Angeles Clippers players
New York Knicks players
Philippine Basketball Association imports
Quad City Thunder players
Rapid City Thrillers players
Santa Barbara Islanders players
Shooting guards
Sioux Falls Skyforce (CBA) players
SMU Mustangs men's basketball players
Topeka Sizzlers players
Tulsa Golden Hurricane men's basketball players
Undrafted National Basketball Association players